The Erie County Jail is a historic Stick/Eastlake building located on Adams Street in Sandusky, Ohio.  It was built from 1882 to 1883 by the firm of Adam Feick & Brother, which consisted of Adam, Philip, and George Feick. The structure was designed to have 26 cells and a sheriff's residence. It was listed on the National Register of Historic Places in 1982.  The building is now part of the Sandusky Library.

References

Jails on the National Register of Historic Places in Ohio
Queen Anne architecture in Ohio
Government buildings completed in 1883
Buildings and structures in Erie County, Ohio
National Register of Historic Places in Erie County, Ohio
Jails in Ohio